Tony Richards (born 9 June 1944) is an English former professional footballer who played in the Football League for Mansfield Town.

References

1944 births
Living people
English footballers
Association football midfielders
English Football League players
Mansfield Town F.C. players